Anketil de Coleshull was the member of Parliament for Coventry in 1295. With Richard de Weston he is the first MP for the city whose name is known. He had been a bailiff.

References 

Members of the Parliament of England for Coventry
English MPs 1295
Bailiffs
Year of birth unknown
Year of death unknown